Jalali (also Romanized as Jalālī; also known as Jalali Ahmadi) is a village in Ahmadi Rural District, Ahmadi District, Hajjiabad County, Hormozgan Province, Iran. At the 2006 census, its population was 171, in 45 families.

References 

Populated places in Hajjiabad County